Below is a list of magnolia species and cultivars which currently (2016)
hold the Royal Horticultural Society's Award of Garden Merit. Magnolias are shrubs or trees which put on a showy display of tulip-like flowers, often scented, in early to late spring. Many are slow-growing and may take several years to start flowering. They are suitable for cultivation in parks or gardens in temperate regions. M. stellata is suitable for smaller gardens.  All are deciduous except for M. grandiflora, which is evergreen. The AGM citation includes a hardiness rating: all of the plants listed here are rated H6 (hardy down to -20 °C to -15 °C) or H5 (hardy down to -15 °C to -10 °C). This is indicated in the column marked H. Nevertheless, magnolias prefer a sheltered spot, and flower buds may be damaged by late frosts. The maximum size (height and spread) is shown in metres.

Listing

Withdrawn

References

Magnolia
Magnolias